Safina is a Kenyan political party.

Safina may also refer to:

People

 Alessandro Safina (born 1963), Italian tenor
 Alsou Safina, (born 1983), birth name of Alsou, Russian singer
 Carl Safina (born 1955), Blue Ocean Institute president
 Dinara Safina (born 1986), Russian professional tennis player
 Yuliya Safina (born 1950), former Soviet/Russian handball player

Places

 Safina, Jordan, a village in northern Jordan

Things

 Safina Nuh the Islamic rendering of Noah's ark as described in Hud (sura)
 Safina-yi Tabriz, a 14th-century manuscript